Kerman was a province in southern Persia.

List of Seljuk rulers of Kerman Seljuk Sultanate 
 Qawurd of Kerman 1041-1073
 Kerman Shah 1073-1074
 Sultan Shah 1074-1075
 Hussain Omar 1075-1084
 Turan Shah I 1084-1096
 Iranshah ibn Turanshah 1096-1101
 Arslan Shah I 1101-1142
 Mehmed I (Muhammad) 1142-1156
 Tuğrul Shah 1156-1169
 Bahram-Shah 1169-1174
 Arslan Shah II 1174-1176
 Turan Shah II 1176-1183
 Muhammad II 1183-1187
Mehmed II overthrown by the Oghuz chief Malik Dinar

Seljuk rulers